Catopta albimacula is a moth in the family Cossidae. It was described by Staudinger in 1899. It is found in Kyrgyzstan, Kazakhstan, Tajikistan and China (Xinjiang Uyghur Autonomous Region).

References

 , 2009: Catoptinae subfam. n., a new subfamily of carpenter-moths (Lepidoptera: Cossidae). Entomological Review 89 (8): 927-932.
 , 2013: A brief review of genus Catopta Staudinger, 1899 (Lepidoptera: Cossidae) with description of a new species from China. Zootaxa 3709 (4): 330-340. Abstract: .

Moths described in 1899
Catoptinae